Shrill is an American comedy streaming television series developed by Aidy Bryant, Alexandra Rushfield, and Lindy West, based on West's book Shrill: Notes from a Loud Woman. The series premiered on March 15, 2019, on Hulu, and stars Bryant in the lead role.

In April 2019, the series was renewed for a second season that premiered on January 24, 2020. In March 2020, the series was renewed for an eight episode third season, which was later confirmed to be the final season; it was released on May 7, 2021.

Premise
Shrill follows "Annie, described as a fat young woman who wants to change her life — but not her body. Annie is trying to make it as a journalist while juggling bad boyfriends, sick parents, and a perfectionist boss, while the world around her deems her not good enough because of her weight. She starts to realize that she's as good as anyone else and acts on it."

Cast and characters

Main
Aidy Bryant as Annie Easton, the main character. Annie is a journalist at The Thorn, promoted from editing the calendar in the first episode, and in her late 20’s. She is very intelligent and optimistic and aspires to do well, and always tries to solve the problems she faces in life.
Lolly Adefope as Fran, Annie's best friend since college who was raised in the UK, they live together and own a dog together, Bonkers. Fran dates women. Her brother, Lamar, has had a crush on Annie for years. Alas, he lives in London.
Luka Jones as Ryan, one of Annie's boyfriends. Ryan works at a hardware store and is rather lazy, although when he tries hard he can be intelligent. (seasons 1–2; recurring season 3)
John Cameron Mitchell as Gabe Parrish, Annie's boss and the editor-in-chief of The Thorn and a former punk singer. At first he was portrayed as an antagonist and enemy to Annie in season 1, they have since come to better terms. He writes a memoir about his early life and the beginnings of The Thorn in the third season. Gabe has a husband.
Ian Owens as Amadi, a close friend of Annie’s. Amadi works with Annie at The Thorn and is promoted to its director of human resources in the second season.
Patti Harrison as Ruthie, the receptionist at The Thorn (season 2; recurring seasons 1 and 3).

Recurring
Julia Sweeney as Vera Easton, Annie's mother. Vera is domineering and constantly tries to solve her daughters problems herself, however later begins treating Annie like an adult. Vera is under a lot of stress due to her husband having cancer, so at times she lashes out at Annie, but does love her.
Daniel Stern as Bill Easton, Annie's father. Bill is less controlling than Vera and is portrayed as bumbling and silly, he cares deeply for his daughter and wife and has a close relationship with Fran.
Sean Tarjyoto as Angus, a reporter at The Thorn who is friends with Annie and Amadi.
Scott Engdahl as Andy, an older reporter at The Thorn who admires Gabe, despite Gabe treating him like a genuine inconvenience. It is revealed in the second season episode "Skate" that he lives a double life as an EDM producer and DJ, going by the moniker "DJ Pussyhound."
Dana Millican as Kim, a reporter at The Thorn (season 1)
Jo Firestone as Maureen, a photographer at The Thorn who greatly admires Annie and becomes a closer friend to her as the show goes on.
Conner O'Malley as Reggie, a distro guy at The Thorn.
Tommy Snider as Mike, Ryan's younger brother and roommate (season 1; guest seasons 2 and 3)
Michael Liu as Pete, Ryan's friend, former coworker, and roommate (season 1; guest season 2)
Gary Richardson as "Calendar" Cody, the new calendar editor at The Thorn who is popular with the staff. (seasons 2-3)
E. R. Fightmaster as Emily, or Em, Fran's romantic partner. They start dating at the end of season 2 due to confessing feelings for each other, however they begin to have relationship trouble when Fran doesn’t want to move in with them (seasons 2–3). 
Illeana Douglas as Sheila Branch, the publisher of The Thorn (seasons 2–3)
Anthony Oberbeck as Nick Powell, an illustrator for The Thorn (season 3; guest season 2)
Cameron Britton as Will Nolan, one of Annie's boyfriends who is also Amadi's best friend (season 3). Will is separated from his wife Michaela who he has been dating since they were in high school.

Guests
Joel Kim Booster as Tony, Gabe's husband who is a photographer (appearing once each season)
Fred Armisen as Bongo, Gabe's friend and former bandmate who also started The Thorn with him (season 3)

Episodes

Season 1 (2019)
{{Episode table |background = #334067 |overall = |season= |title = |director = |writer = |airdate = 20 |released = y |episodes =  

{{Episode list
|EpisodeNumber = 4
|EpisodeNumber2 = 4
|Title = Pool
|DirectedBy = Shaka King
|WrittenBy = Samantha Irby
|OriginalAirDate = 
|ShortSummary = In a flashback to Annie's younger years, her mother encourages her to join the family in the hotel pool, but Annie opts out. Fran establishes a "No Ryan" zone in the house. Annie pitches another story about an "inclusive" pool party for plus-size women that Gabe rejects, but Annie attends anyway with Fran. While Fran flirts with a new girlfriend, Annie loses track of time and misses the bike ride. Gabe humiliates her, insinuating her weight is holding her back from success. Infuriated, Annie posts an article entitled "Hello, I'm Fat" on The Thorn'''s website. In another flashback, Annie goes alone to the pool.
|LineColor = 334067
}}

}}

Season 2 (2020)

Production
Development
On April 24, 2018, it was announced that Hulu was developing a television series adaptation of Lindy West's memoir Shrill: Notes from a Loud Woman with a pilot written by West, Ali Rushfield, and Saturday Night Live's Aidy Bryant. Executive producers were expected to include Lorne Michaels, Andrew Singer, Elizabeth Banks, and Max Handelman. Production companies involved with the series were set to consist of Broadway Video and Brownstone Productions.

On June 13, 2018, it was reported that Hulu had given the production a straight-to-series order. On August 1, 2018, the series order was confirmed and it was clarified that it was for a first season consisting of six episodes. It was further announced that the first episode of the series would be directed by Jesse Peretz and the second by Carrie Brownstein. Additionally, Rushfield and West were added as executive producers, Bryant as a co-executive producer, and Dannah Shinder as a producer.

On December 11, 2018, it was announced that the series would premiere on March 15, 2019. On April 15, 2019, the series was renewed for a second season that premiered on January 24, 2020. On March 31, 2020, the series was renewed for a third season. On January 27, 2021, Hulu announced that the third season would be the final season.

Casting
Alongside the initial development announcement, it was confirmed that Aidy Bryant would star in the production. Alongside the series order confirmation, it was announced that the series would co-star Lolly Adefope, Luka Jones, Ian Owens, and John Cameron Mitchell. On September 5, 2018, it was reported that Julia Sweeney had been cast in a starring role.

Filming
Principal photography for season one took place from the week of July 30, 2018, until the week of September 10, 2018, in Portland, Oregon. Season two began shooting in July 2019 until the week of September 7, 2019, again in Portland. Filming for season three started in October 2020, and ended on December 26, 2020, due to the ongoing COVID-19 pandemic. Coincidentally, it started shooting around the time Bryant returned for her ninth season on Saturday Night Live, so she took time off from SNL to film the season (she appeared in the first episode of the season, and appeared once in a pre-taped segment in the third episode, during the first half of the season).

Release
The series held its world premiere during the 2019 South by Southwest film festival in Austin, Texas as a part of the festival's "Episodic Premieres" series of screenings.

Reception

Critical response
On the review aggregator website Rotten Tomatoes, the first season holds an approval rating of 93% based on 54 reviews, with an average rating of 7.91/10. The website's critical consensus reads, "Sharp social commentary and a star-making performance from Aidy Bryant help Shrill overcome its familiar comedic sensibilities to create a show that proves self-acceptance isn't one size fits all." On Metacritic the first season has a score of 74 out of 100, based on reviews from 27 critics, indicating "generally favorable reviews".

Kelly Lawler from USA Today gave the series a positive review, calling it an "unflinchingly authentic depiction of a fat woman in the modern world" and acknowledging that it "flies past positivity and shoots for fat acceptance." Pop Culture Happy Hour's Linda Holmes, who is plus-sized, applauded the writers for giving the protagonist the best lines, instead of handing them off to secondary or supporting characters. Holmes writes: "seeing her perform such strong material is a delight".The Washington Post gave the show a more negative review, writing, "Shrill is mostly just another show that wants to make fun while also making essentially unarguable points about modern manners." Robyn Bahr of The Hollywood Reporter criticized the series, opening with, "Warning: A fat woman has written this review" and later stating that the show is "not as sharp as it should be". She also criticized the show's writing, saying, "her relationships are too underdeveloped to emotionally invest in." Verne Gay from Newsday also criticized the series, writing, "Shrill'' too often feels more like that extended trope than fully developed series."

Awards

References

External links
 
 
 Official screenplay of the series finale

2019 American television series debuts
2010s American comedy television series
2021 American television series endings
2020s American comedy television series
English-language television shows
Fat acceptance movement
Hulu original programming
Obesity in television
Television series about journalism
Television series by Broadway Video
Television series by Brownstone Productions
Television series by Warner Bros. Television Studios
Television shows based on non-fiction books
Television shows set in Portland, Oregon
Transgender-related television shows